Michael Zigomanis (born January 17, 1981) is a Canadian former professional ice hockey centre. Zigomanis was drafted twice. In the 1999 NHL Entry Draft he was selected 64th overall by the Buffalo Sabres, but was not signed. He re-entered for the 2001 NHL Entry Draft and was selected by the Carolina Hurricanes 46th overall.

Zigomanis was born in North York, Ontario, but grew up in Markham, Ontario.

Early life
He was born to Macedonian parents who emigrated to Canada from Kastoria, Greece. As a youth, he played in the 1995 Quebec International Pee-Wee Hockey Tournament with a minor ice hockey team from North York. Zigomanis attended Father Michael McGivney Catholic Academy in Markham, graduating in 2000.

Playing career
Zigomanis played four seasons of junior hockey with the Kingston Frontenacs of the Ontario Hockey League (OHL). He was chosen in the 2nd round, 25th overall by the Frontenacs in the 1997 OHL Priority Selection Draft. In his first season with the Frontenacs, he scored 23 goals and 74 points in 62 games. His numbers increased the following year, collecting 29 goals and 85 points. His third year saw another increase, marking 40 goals and 94 points, good for fifth best in the league. The 2000–01 season was his last in the OHL, where he scored 40 goals and 77 points in 52 games. He finished his career with the Frontenacs with 330 points, fourth on the team's all-time scoring list. He represented Canada at the 2001 World Junior Hockey Championships, where he scored 2 goals and 6 points on the way to third place (bronze medal).

Zigomanis was originally drafted in the 2nd round, 64th overall, by the Buffalo Sabres in the 1999 NHL Entry Draft. Zigomanis agreed to terms with the Sabres just before the 5 pm deadline on June 1, 2001, but there was a typographical error in his contract that was faxed to the league offices. By the time the error was discovered, the deadline had passed, and the NHL ruled that he would have to re-enter the NHL draft, as he had not been signed before the deadline. He re-entered the draft and was selected in the 2nd round again, this time 46th overall by Carolina Hurricanes in 2001. Carolina signed Zigomanis to a three-year contract on October 4, 2001, and he was assigned to the Hurricanes' American Hockey League (AHL) affiliate, the Lowell Lock Monsters.

On January 30, 2006, Zigomanis, Jesse Boulerice, Magnus Kahnberg, first round and fourth round picks in the 2006 NHL Entry Draft and a fourth round pick in the 2007 NHL Entry Draft were traded to the St. Louis Blues for Doug Weight and Erkki
Rajamaki along with some retention of Weight's salary. He finished the season splitting time with the Blues and their AHL affiliate, the Peoria Rivermen.

In the 2006 offseason, Zigomanis left the Blues and signed a two-year contract with the Phoenix Coyotes. He became known as a faceoff specialist with the Coyotes, finished seventh best in the league. The Coyotes signed him to a contract extension through the 2008–09 season on February 16, 2007. On October 9, 2008, he was traded to the Pittsburgh Penguins for future considerations. While in Pittsburgh, Zigomanis provided faceoff and penalty killing expertise. He played 22 games with the Penguins before he seriously injured his shoulder in December. Zigomanis was only cleared to play in the Stanley Cup finals. He won the Stanley Cup with the Penguins that year.

An unrestricted free agent after his time in Pittsburgh, Zigomanis signed a professional tryout with the Toronto Marlies of the AHL on October 19, 2009. Zigomanis played only seven games but managed to score 13 points (all assists) before leaving for Europe on November 10, 2009, signing a contract for the rest of the 2009–10 season with Djurgårdens IF of the Swedish Elitserien.

On July 15, 2010, Zigomanis signed as a free agent to return to Toronto, signing a one-year, two-way contract with the Toronto Maple Leafs. On July 12, 2011, Zigomanis signed a one-year, two-way contract with the Maple Leafs worth $665,000 at the NHL level and $300,000 at the AHL level. After recording professional career highs of 61 points during the 2011–12 season, Zigomanis opted to remain with the Marlies and was re-signed to a one-year AHL contract as a free agent on July 30, 2012.

On July 10, 2013, Zigomanis signed an AHL-only contract with the Rochester Americans, the minor-league affiliate of the Buffalo Sabres, the team that drafted him in 1999.

Brand ambassador
After joining the Toronto Maple Leafs, Cheetah energy drinks CEO Frank D'Angelo signed Zigomanis to a promotional contract. However, after Zigomanis was demoted to the club's minor league affiliate, and nude photos of the player which he had sent to an ex-girlfriend surfaced online, D'Angelo cited breach of contract for allegedly not living up to a morals clause in the contract. D'Angelo released Zigomanis from his contract as a "brand ambassador" for Cheetah. Zigomanis sued for breach of contract and won a settlement.

Broadcasting career

Zigomanis worked for the Toronto sports radio station Sportsnet 590 The Fan co-hosting the morning show from September 2019 until September 2021.

Career statistics

Regular season and playoffs

International

Awards and honours

References

External links

1981 births
Living people
Slavic speakers of Greek Macedonia
Buffalo Sabres draft picks
Canadian ice hockey centres
Canadian people of Macedonian descent
Carolina Hurricanes draft picks
Carolina Hurricanes players
Djurgårdens IF Hockey players
Kingston Frontenacs players
Lowell Lock Monsters players
Peoria Rivermen (AHL) players
Phoenix Coyotes players
Pittsburgh Penguins players
Rochester Americans players
San Antonio Rampage players
Stanley Cup champions
Sportspeople from Markham, Ontario
Sportspeople from North York
Ice hockey people from Toronto
St. Louis Blues players
Toronto Maple Leafs players
Toronto Marlies players
Canadian expatriate ice hockey players in Sweden